Boubacar Diarra (born 15 July 1979) is a Malian former professional footballer who played as central defender. Having started his senior career with Djoliba AC, he moved to Germany in 1997 joining SC Freiburg where he amassed over 200 league matches in a decade-long spell. He signed with 1. FC Kaiserslautern in 2007 but only spent half a season there. He went on to play for Swiss club FC Luzern and Liaoning Hongyun of China before returning to Mali with AS Bamako.

Career
Born in Bamako, Diarra started his career at Djoliba AC.

In 1997, he moved to Europe joining German club SC Freiburg where he spent a decade. Following a short period with 1. FC Kaiserslautern, where his chance to play was limited by a broken arm, he joined Swiss club FC Luzern in 2008.

On 11 March 2010, Diarra left Lucerne and joined Chinese Super League club Liaoning Hongyun.

Honours
Mali
Africa Cup of Nations fourth place: 2002

References

External links
 

1979 births
Living people
Sportspeople from Bamako
Malian footballers
Association football defenders
Mali international footballers
2002 African Cup of Nations players
SC Freiburg players
1. FC Kaiserslautern players
FC Luzern players
Liaoning F.C. players
Djoliba AC players
AS Real Bamako players
Bundesliga players
2. Bundesliga players
Chinese Super League players
Swiss Super League players
Malian expatriate footballers
Malian expatriate sportspeople in Germany
Expatriate footballers in Germany
Malian expatriate sportspeople in Switzerland
Expatriate footballers in Switzerland
Malian expatriate sportspeople in China
Expatriate footballers in China
21st-century Malian people